Rhodanobacter koreensis is a Gram-negative, aerobic, rod-shaped and non-motile  bacterium from the genus of Rhodanobacter which has been isolated from rhizospheric soil of a tomato plant.

References

Xanthomonadales
Bacteria described in 2015